

This is a list of properties on the National Register of Historic Places in Vermilion County, Illinois.

This is intended to be a complete list of the properties and districts on the National Register of Historic Places in Vermilion County, Illinois, United States. Latitude and longitude coordinates are provided for many National Register properties and districts; these locations may be seen together in a map.

There are 13 properties and districts listed on the National Register in the county.  Another two properties were once listed but have been removed.

Current listings

|}

Former listing

|}

See also
 
 List of National Historic Landmarks in Illinois
 National Register of Historic Places listings in Illinois

References

 
Vermilion County